Bernhard Severin Ingemann (28 May 1789 – 24 February 1862) was a Danish novelist and poet.

Biography
Ingemann was born in  Torkilstrup, on the island of Falster, Denmark.  The son of a vicar, he was left fatherless in his youth. While a student at the University of Copenhagen he published his first collection of poems (1811; vol. ii., 1812), which show great influence of German romanticism. Critics describe their sickly sentimentality as reflecting the unhealthy condition of the poet's body and mind at this time. These works were followed by a long allegorical poem, De sorte Riddere (The Black Knights, 1814), which closed his first period.

Then followed six plays, of which the best is considered to be Reinald Underbarnet (The Miraculous Child Reinald, 1816), and the most popular, Blanca, (1815). In 1817 he published his first prose work, De Underjordiske, et bornholmsk Eventyr (The Subterranean Ones, a Story of Bornholm), which was followed in 1820 by Eventyr og Fortællinger (Narratives and Miraculous Tales), many of them imitations of Hoffmann. During 1818–19 he traveled on the Continent.

In 1822 was appointed instructor of the Danish Language and Literature at the Academy of Sorø. During his next period, inspired by Scott's Waverley novels, Ingemann produced his series of historical romances, by virtue of which he disputes with H. C. Andersen the title of the children's writer of Denmark. Their subjects are all taken from Danish history. The first, and perhaps the best, is Valdemar Sejr (Valdemar the Victorious, 1826), which was followed by Erik Menveds Barndom (Erik Menved's Childhood, 1828); Kong Erik og de Fredløse (King Erik and the Outlaws, 1833); and Prins Otto af Danmark og Hans Samtid (Prince Otto of Denmark and his Time, 1835).

While his historical romances show a lack of accuracy, their strong nationality gives them a special interest to the student of Danish culture. In reality they mean the introduction of the historical novel in Danish literature. A later artistic novel Landsbybørnene from 1852 ("The Village Children") is now almost forgotten.

Known as the fourth great Danish hymn writer (after Kingo, Brorson and Grundtvig), Ingemann is considered less rooted in Biblical dogma and more borne up by a general spiritual and religious interest. A simple naivete runs through them. Especially popular were his Morgen og Aftensange (Morning and Evening Songs), a collection of religious poems of great beauty and spirituality written during 1837–39. They were set to music by the composer Weyse. Many of them have been classics in Danish schools (for instance I Østen stiger Solen op – ”In the East the Sun rises” and Fred hviler over Land og By – ”Peace is resting over Land and Town”). Also his Christmas hymns are popular. He also wrote poems of historic and mythological content in the heroic saga Holger Danske (“Ogier the Dane”, 1837).

He was a personal friend of Grundtvig who was in some degrees his mentor and with whom he shared a deep interest of Danish medieval history. Often they have been regarded almost mental twins in spite of clear differences. Also Blicher and H. C. Andersen must be mentioned among his friends.

Ingemann was in his elder years much respected and after the death of Oehlenschläger he was regarded the unofficial poet-king of Denmark. Critics cite Ingemann's grace and delicacy, rather than strength, of style, both in prose and poetry. He died in Sorø.

Ingemann was married to Lucie Marie Mandix (1792–1868), a painter, whose works still hang in Danish churches.

Written works

Songs
 I sne står urt og busk i skjul (1831)
 I alle de riger og lande (1837)
 I østen stiger solen op (1837)
 Lysets engel går med glans (1837)
 Nu titte til hinanden (1837)
  (1838)
 Julen har bragt velsignet bud (1839)
 Den store mester kommer (1841)
 Stork! stork! Langeben! (1842)
 Dejlig er jorden (1850)
 Glade jul, dejlige jul (1850)
 Julen har englelyd (1569)
 Nu vågne alle Guds fugle små (1837)

Short stories
 Eventyr og Fortællinger (1820)
 Glasskabet (1847)

Epic poems
 Valdemar den Store og hans Mænd (1824)
 Dronning Margrete (1836)
 Holger Danske (1837)

Novels
 Valdemar Seier (1826)
 Erik Menveds Barndom (1828)
 Kong Erik og de Fredløse (1833)
 Prinds Otto af Danmark (1834)

References

 Universal Cyclopædia & Atlas, 1902, New York, D. Appleton & Co.
 Samlede Skrifter (Collected Works, xli. vols., Copenhagen, 1843–65.
 Nils Holger Petersen, "B.S. Ingemann: Danish Medievalism in the Nineteenth Century," in: Cahier Calin: Makers of the Middle Ages. Essays in Honor of William Calin '', ed. Richard Utz and Elizabeth Emery (Kalamazoo, MI: Studies in Medievalism, 2011), pp. 33–35.

External links

B. S. Ingemann at Kalliope.
B. S. Ingemann at the Cyber Hymnal.
B. S. Ingemann at Danish Wikisource.
B. S. Ingemann in the Encyclopædia Britannica. 
B. S. Ingemann's texts set to music at the LiederNet Archive
B. S. Ingemann at the Archive for Danish Literature.
 
 
 
Short story
The Sealed Room
Christmas hymn
Dejlig er jorden: Danish lyrics
 Dejlig er jorden: English lyrics
Dejlig er jorden: sung in Norwegian by Carsten Woll. 
Translations of Ingemann
Through the Night of Doubt and Sorrow (Igjennem Nat og Trængsel)
Often I am happy (Tit er jeg glad)
The sun that in the east does rise (I østen stiger solen op)
Peace rests o’er town and countryside (Fred hviler over land og by)
The beauteous earth’s late sun is furled (Den skjønne jordens sol gik ned)

1789 births
1862 deaths
Danish male poets
Danish Lutheran hymnwriters
Danish male novelists
19th-century Danish poets
19th-century male writers
19th-century Danish novelists
People from Sorø Municipality
People from Guldborgsund Municipality
19th-century Lutherans